Francisco Javier 'Fran' Moreno Jiménez (born 7 May 1984) is a Spanish professional footballer who plays for Racing Murcia FC as an attacking midfielder.

Club career
Born in Pamplona, Navarre, Moreno appeared seven times for local CA Osasuna in the 2005–06 season, as the club tied a best-ever fourth place in La Liga – no games complete, two starts. He made his debut in the competition on 18 September 2005, playing 22 minutes in a 1–0 home win against Sevilla FC.

After two second level loans, at CD Numancia and Albacete Balompié, Moreno was released in 2008, resuming his career in division three, first with lowly CD Linares. He only returned to division two in 2014–15, contributing with 19 appearances as CD Leganés retained their league status and being released at the end of the campaign.

References

External links

1984 births
Living people
Footballers from Pamplona
Spanish footballers
Association football midfielders
La Liga players
Segunda División players
Segunda División B players
Tercera División players
CA Osasuna B players
CA Osasuna players
CD Numancia players
Albacete Balompié players
CD Linares players
Deportivo Alavés players
Ontinyent CF players
CD Alcoyano footballers
CD Olímpic de Xàtiva footballers
CD Leganés players
Real Murcia players
Lleida Esportiu footballers
FC Jumilla players
CF La Nucía players
Racing Murcia FC players